Sabarimala Trek is an important trek route to Sannidhanam, the abode of Ayyappan. It covers a distance of about  through the mountainous terrains and thick forests which are inhabited by many wild animals. It is believed that Ayyappa used this path in his expedition to kill Mahishi, a demoness. Even now, many pilgrims heading towards Sabarimala use this route, especially the pilgrims from Kerala, Andhra Pradesh, Telangana, Karnataka and Tamil Nadu.

Important rest stops

Erumely
This is the starting point of the trek. Most devotees visit the mosque/mausoleum of Vavar Swamy situated in Erumely. It is believed that Vavar swamy (a Muslim devotee of Ayyappa) protects devotees travelling through the Erumely pathway.

Peroorthodu
Peroorthodu is a stream-crossing as well as the first stop on this path, almost  from Erumely. Devotees often bathe here and the Kanniayyappas offers "Malarpodi" and "Aripodi" before their journey.

Kalaketty
According to the legends, Lord Shiva came on his ox and tied it to a banyan tree to witness the killing of the demoness Mahishi by his beloved son, Ayyappa. There is a shrine here dedicated to Lord Shiva and the pilgrims burn camphor and break coconuts as a part of the rituals.

Azhutha
Azhutha, a tributary of Pamba River is just  from Kalaketty. In Sanskrit, Azhutha is termed as Alamba. Pilgrims have facilities to take rest here. There is also a temple here administrated by the "Malayaraya mahasabha", who has also the administrative controls of Kalaketty, Inchippara and Mukkuzhy temples. The far river side is known as the "Azhutha medu" which is a steep slope.

Kallidamkunnu
The steep Azhutha medu ends at the summit Kallidamkunnu. As part of the customs, the devotees take a pebble from Azhutha river which they drop at Kallidamkunnu to cover the remains of Mahishi. Devotees also burns a camphor here before their journey.

Inchipparakotta
The place got its name due to the presence of a fort built by Udaya. There is a temple here named Kottayil Sastha temple, dedicated to the Inchippara moopan, the guardian of the sacred forests.

Mukkuzhy
Mukkuzhy is situated at a valley. A temple dedicated to Devi is situated here which is administrated by the 'Malayaraya Mahasabha'. Devotees who are tired and unable to continue trekking can and should get help here. It is near to Kuzhimavu bus stand in Koruthodu Panchayat and connected by a concrete road. From Kuzhimavu, buses and taxis are available to Pamba/Sabarimala. Frequent buses are available from Kuzhimavu to Mundakayam.

Karimala
Karimala (Black Hill / Elephant Hill ('Kari': elephant in Malayalam)) is a hazardous point on the trail which is inhabited by many elephants. Pilgrims will have to cross eight levels in Karimala hill to reach its summit. Here, devotees often lights fire to escape from the wild animals and cold. There is a Nazhikkinar (well within a well) here which benefits many pilgrims. They offer their prayers to Karimalanathan (the protector of Karimala) and Karimala Bhagavathy (at the summit) for a risk-free journey.

Valiyanavattom
The steep Karimala hill ends at Valiyanavattom which is the abode of wild elephants.

Cheriyanavattom
It is the stop just before Pamba.

References

Hiking trails in India
Tourist attractions in Pathanamthitta district